Liceo scientifico statale Camillo Cavour (in English State scientific lyceum Camillo Cavour) is a liceo scientifico located in Rome, in via delle Carine 1, in Rione Monti. It was the first scientific high school in Rome, and potentially in the whole Italy.

History

The Liceo Cavour was established in 1871 as the Physics and Mathematics branch of the Regio Istituto Tecnico di Roma (which later became the Istituto Tecnico-Commerciale Leonardo Da Vinci). After the Gentile Reform in 1923, this school became the Regio Liceo Scientifico di Roma, under the royal legislative decree of 9 September 1923, n. 1915. It was founded in 1923-24, as the scientific branch of liceo classico Ennio Quirino Visconti, the first liceo classico in Rome. In 1926 the Regio Liceo Scientifico di Roma was established as an independent body, starting teaching in 1926-27. In 1946, with the inauguration of the Liceo Scientifico Statale Augusto Righi (a branch of the Regio Liceo), the school was renamed "Liceo Scientifico Camillo Cavour".

Among the more famous people to have worked here were the poet Margherita Guidacci, English language and literature teacher from 1965 to 1975, Gioacchino Gesmundo, History and Philosophy teacher from 1934 to 1944, and the physicist Bruno Pontecorvo (who was part of the group of physicists and scientists named 'I Ragazzi di Via Panisperna', translated as Via Panisperna Boys) with his younger brother Umberto. Notable former students include Franca Falcucci, the future Minister of public education, and Marta Russo, whose murder garnered huge media attention.

Structure

Since its foundation until 1962, the liceo was based at 'ITC Leonardo da Vinci', in via Cavour 258. In October 1962 it moved to the new building in via Vittorino da Feltre 6, near the Colosseum. The building was built between 1884 and 1887 by architect Luca Carimini, and it initially housed the Missionary Oblates of Mary Immaculate college. In 1905, when the headquarters of the Oblates was moved to Rome, a second building was constructed close to the first one, and the access on via delle Carine was opened. The school is housed in both buildings.

Inside the liceo, in addition to several classrooms, there are a Chemistry laboratory and a Physics laboratory, Technical drawing classrooms, a language laboratory, a ICT laboratory, a lecture hall, a library, two gyms, two volleyball courts, a basketball court and a cafe.

Curriculum
The liceo offers the traditional study plan of liceo scientifico. Until their abolition in 2010 as a result of the Gelmini Reform, a PNI trial (National plan of Computer Studies) and a bilingualism trial were activated; after the reform, they were blocked till depletion.

Philately
On 29 September 2001, to celebrate the 75th anniversary of the school, Poste Italiane issued a postage stamp that portrayed the Liceo. Designed by Luigi Vangelli, it was produced in  copies.

Links
 It can be reached from Colosseo and Cavour stations.
 It will be reachable, by 2025, from Fori Imperiali/Colosseo station.

See also

 Liceo Ginnasio Ennio Quirino Visconti
 Liceo Ginnasio Torquato Tasso

References

Bibliography

External links
 Official website

Schools in Rome
Rome R. I Monti
Secondary schools in Italy